Marcus Oliver Johnstone Mumford (born 31 January 1987) is a British singer, songwriter, musician, and record producer. He is best known as the lead singer of the folk band Mumford & Sons. He also plays a number of instruments with the group, including guitar, drums and mandolin. He is married to English actress Carey Mulligan.

Early life and career
Mumford was born on 31 January 1987 in Yorba Linda, California, to English parents, John and Eleanor (née Weir-Breen) Mumford, international leaders of the Vineyard Churches. As a result, he has held both UK and US citizenship from birth.
Mumford has an older brother, James. 
Mumford's family moved back to the UK when Marcus was six months old. He grew up on Chatsworth Avenue in Wimbledon Chase, southwest London, and was educated at King's College School in Wimbledon, where he met future band member Ben Lovett. He returned to London to focus on his music career after his first year of study at the University of Edinburgh, where he collaborated on Mumford & Sons' debut album, Sigh No More.

Mumford has revealed that he was sexually abused as a child: "Not by family and not in the church, which might be some people’s assumption. But I hadn’t told anyone about it for 30 years".

Mumford began his musical career playing drums for Laura Marling on tour, along with the other current members of Mumford & Sons. It was through touring with Marling and gaining experience playing gigs as well as experimenting with his early writing that they decided to form the band in 2007.

Mumford was included in the Forbes 30 Under 30 list of music stars in December 2012 for his achievements with his band. Forbes commented of the list, which also included acts such as Adele and Rihanna: "In sum they represent the entrepreneurial, creative and intellectual best of their generation. Individually, they are engaging, surprising and incredibly hardworking."

Mumford sang a cover of "Dink's Song" with Oscar Isaac for the 2013 Coen brothers film Inside Llewyn Davis. Although he is not seen in the film, Mumford voices the protagonist's musical partner, Mike, who dies by suicide before the beginning of the film.

Mumford is featured on the 2014 album Lost on the River: The New Basement Tapes, a collective/Supergroup with other musicians including Elvis Costello, Rhiannon Giddens, Taylor Goldsmith, Jim James, produced by T Bone Burnett. Mumford takes co-writing credits on tracks "Kansas City", "When I Get My Hands on You", "Stranger", "The Whistle Is Blowing", and "Lost on the River #20". On 23 September 2014, the video for "When I Get My Hands on You" was released and features him on lead vocals. 

Mumford & Sons' third album, Wilder Mind, was released on 4 May 2015.

Mumford & Sons' fourth album, Delta, was released on 16 November 2018, featuring appearances from Maggie Rogers, Yebba and Gill Landry.

On 12 July 2022, Mumford announced his debut solo album Self-Titled would be released in September of that year. Produced by Blake Mills, it features guests Brandi Carlile, Phoebe Bridgers, Clairo and Monica Martin and includes "Cannibal", a song Mumford wrote in January 2021 about his personal struggles. Steven Spielberg directed the music video for the song, which was shot on 3 July in a high school gym in New York.

Production work
In 2014 Mumford produced Hold Fast by Christian Letts (Edward Sharpe and the Magnetic Zeros), released February 2015. Mumford co-wrote four tracks from the record - "Copper Bells", "La Mer", "Emeralds" and "Matches".

Mumford produced the album Gamble for a Rose by King Charles, released January 2016.

Personal life
In April 2012, he married Carey Mulligan in Somerset. They were childhood pen pals who reconnected as adults. They married a few weeks after working together on the Coen brothers film Inside Llewyn Davis. They have two children.

Mumford is a supporter of AFC Wimbledon.

Discography

Studio albums

Singles

As lead artist

As featured artist

Soundtracks

 Ted Lasso (2020)

Guest appearances

Music videos

References

External links
 
 
 

1987 births
21st-century American guitarists
21st-century American singers
21st-century American male singers
21st-century British singers
21st-century British guitarists
Alumni of the University of Edinburgh
American baritones
American folk singers
American folk guitarists
American male guitarists
American people of English descent
British baritones
British folk singers
British folk guitarists
British male guitarists
British male singers
Grammy Award winners
Guitarists from California
Lead guitarists
Living people
Mumford & Sons members
Musicians from Anaheim, California
Musicians from London
People educated at King's College School, London
People from Wimbledon, London
The New Basement Tapes members